F.V.V.A. - Femmes Voitures Villas Argent is a 1972 drama film directed by Moustapha Alassane.

Synopsis
Ali is a modest civil servant who enjoys a pleasant life in town. One day, upon being forced by his parents to marry a woman he doesn't want, Ali is dragged into a vortex composed by "Women (Femmes), Cars (Voitures), Villas, Money (Argent)" all of which, in Niger, stand for social success. Longing for an increasingly luxurious way of life, in order to support habits he himself created, Ali is forced to steal and is arrested. When everyone else abandons him, his first wife reveals her loyalty and awaits his release.
The film depicts the frantic search for consumer goods by the low middle classes of the African cities and it was, according to Véronique Cayla, director of the Centre national de la Cinématographie (France), of remarking importance for the youngsters back in those years.

Festivals
 Rotterdam International Film Festival, The Netherlands (2010)

Awards
 Prize OCAM at FESPACO - Panafrican Film and Television Festival of Ouagadougo, Burkina Faso (1972)

See also
 Moustapha Alassane

External links
F.V.V.A. - Femmes Voitures Villas Argent - IMDb page about F.V.V.A. - Femmes Voitures Villas Argent

References

Nigerien drama films
1972 films
1972 drama films